"Te fallé" is a song written and recorded by Mexican singer Christian Nodal.

"Te fallé" was released as Nodal's second single and was a commercial success, topping the Mexican charts and Billboard's Regional Mexican Airplay chart in the United States.

Music video
The music video for the song was directed by Fernando Lugo. It has over 103 million views as of July 2018.

Charts

Weekly charts

Year-end charts

Certifications

Release history

See also
List of number-one songs of 2018 (Mexico)
List of number-one Billboard Regional Mexican Songs of 2018

References

2017 singles
Ranchera songs
Spanish-language songs
2017 songs
Universal Music Latin Entertainment singles
Monitor Latino Top General number-one singles
Christian Nodal songs
Songs written by Christian Nodal